Kirsten Lee Clark (born April 23, 1977) is a former World Cup alpine ski racer from the United States. Born in Portland, Maine, she made her World Cup debut in November 1995 and retired from international competition following the 2007 season.

Clark competed for the U.S. in three Winter Olympics (1998, 2002, and 2006) and six World Championships, winning the silver medal in the Super G in 2003.

External links
 
 Kirsten Clark World Cup standings at the International Ski Federation
 
 
 
 Kirsten Clark-Rickenbach at Ski Museum of Maine

1977 births
Living people
American female alpine skiers
Olympic alpine skiers of the United States
Alpine skiers at the 1998 Winter Olympics
Alpine skiers at the 2002 Winter Olympics
Alpine skiers at the 2006 Winter Olympics
21st-century American women